Kadebostany (stylized in all caps) is a Swiss electronic band formed by DJ/producer Guillaume de Kadebostany, also known as  President Kadebostan. They achieved chart success with their song "Castle in the Snow". The band have also become known for their live performances.

Members 
Guillaume de Kadebostany – founder, composer, producer, samples
Célia – vocals, guitar (from 2020)
Marc Veuthey – drums
Ross Butcher – trombone

Former members 
Amina Cadelli – vocals, lyrics (2012–2015)
Jérôme Léonard – Bass & Guitar (2011–2014)
Kristina – vocals, guitar, bass (2016–2020)

Discography

Albums

Singles 

*Did not appear in the official Belgian Ultratop 50 charts, but rather in the bubbling under Ultratip charts.

Others
 "Walking with a Ghost" (July 2012)
 "Crazy in Love" (July 2013)
 "Jolan" (October 2013)
 "Palabras" (February 2014)
 "Frozen to Death" (May 2016)
 "Mind If I Stay" (June 2017)

References

External links 
 
 Official Facebook

Swiss musical groups
2008 establishments in Switzerland